Thomas J. McInerney is the president and CEO of Altaba, and a board member of HSN Inc., Interval Leisure Group Inc., and Match Group. He was the Executive Vice President and Chief Financial Officer of IAC/InterActiveCorp. He served on the special committee set up at Yahoo! to investigate the CEO's misstated college degree.

He graduated from Yale College and Harvard Business School.

References

Living people
Directors of Yahoo!
Year of birth missing (living people)
American chief executives
IAC (company) people
American corporate directors
Yale College alumni
Harvard Business School alumni